Somewhere Back in Time - The Best of: 1980 - 1989 is a best of release by the British heavy metal band Iron Maiden, containing a selection of songs originally recorded for their first eight albums (including Live After Death).

Background

The album was released in conjunction with the band's Somewhere Back In Time World Tour to allow new fans to listen to a selection of the band's material that was played on the tour. The cover artwork by Derek Riggs features the Pharaoh Eddie monument from Powerslave and Cyborg Eddie from Somewhere in Time.

A number of tracks were taken from the band's 1985 live album, Live After Death, because the band preferred to use recordings which featured current Iron Maiden vocalist Bruce Dickinson rather than Paul Di'Anno, who sang on their first two studio releases.

Reception

Reviews for the compilation were generally positive, with Kerrang! commenting that "metal collections don't come much more solid than this." Classic Rock deemed it "a relentless, 70-minute crowd pleaser marathon," containing "timeless anthems that still make the adrenalin surge and the sinews stiffen after all these years." Metal Hammer praised it for being "a reminder of why Iron Maiden became the most important band on the planet back in the 1980s - and why, once again, they've reclaimed that crown."

AllMusic, however, were more critical of the release, deeming the album "merely adequate" and decrying the band's decision to avoid using the original versions of songs featuring Paul Di'Anno on lead vocals.

Track listing
All songs written by Steve Harris, except where noted.

Personnel
Production and performance credits are adapted from the album liner notes.
Iron Maiden
Bruce Dickinson - lead vocals
Steve Harris - bass guitar, keyboards on 10 & 12
Dave Murray - guitars
Adrian Smith - guitars, keyboards on 10 & 12
Nicko McBrain - drums on tracks 2 - 5, 9 - 13 & 15
Clive Burr - drums on tracks 6 - 8 & 14
Production
Martin Birch – producer, mixing
Derek Riggs – cover illustration
Ross Halfin – photography
Peacock – art direction, design
Rod Smallwood – management
Andy Taylor – management

Charts

Certifications

References

2008 greatest hits albums
Iron Maiden compilation albums
EMI Records compilation albums
Heavy metal compilation albums